Lewis deSoto (born 1954 in San Bernardino, California) is an American artist of Cahuilla Native American ancestry.

Berkeley Art Museum and Pacific Film Archive Director Lawrence Rinder writes: "deSoto has explored a wide variety of media in his efforts to express the nuances of various social histories and worldwide cosmologies."

The majority of deSoto's work has been in the media of photography, sculpture,  and installation. The San Jose Institute of Contemporary Art writes that "deSoto's multimedia installations combine sound, light, video, space, and sculpture elements and are site-specific or oriented toward making a complete environment. His conceptual artwork utilizes automobiles, inflatables, electronics, photography, wood and metal construction."

DeSoto is based in Napa, California and New York City and has been a professor of photography at San Francisco State University since 1988.

Background

DeSoto grew up in San Bernardino, California and received a Master of Fine Arts from Claremont Graduate School in 1981 after receiving a BA in Studio Art with a minor in Religious Studies at the University of California, Riverside in 1978.

The last name that de Soto shares with famed Spanish conquistador Hernando de Soto has been "a source of much confusion," says the artist: "My heritage is vaguely linked to this ‘explorer.’ Somehow my great grandfather, the Spaniard Terbosio De Soto, married into the Southern California Cahuilla tribe early in the 20th century."

Early work

In the 2016 publication EMPIRE, deSoto writes that he began taking photographs of his model cars when he was ten years old; he later graduated to documenting the world around him using Polaroid and Minolta cameras handed down from his father.

In Visions of America: Landscape as Metaphor in the Late Twentieth Century, Rebecca Solnit writes that "deSoto's oeuvre begins with Botanica (1980), a series of photographs of flowers that Solnit says "abandon the rules for landscape photography": Solnit posits that the delicate, blurry movements resulting from the slow exposure and flash of deSoto's camera suggest a mechanical analog to the natural beauty of their subject and reflect a process- and time-based emphasis on the "encounter" that would later inform deSoto's installation work.

Subsequent projects such as Tahualtapa (1983-1988) began to draw more explicitly from deSoto's Cahuilla background. The series documents the gradual leveling of a mountain (called Tahualtapa in the Cahuilla language) in what is now called San Bernardino County through a series of photographs whose frames are filled with materials relating to the mountain's history such as feathers, marble, and cement. DeSoto also began transitioning from photography to installation via works such as the "Site Projects" (1980-1986), which combined large-scale manipulations and "non-destructive" interventions in the actual landscape reminiscent of Robert Smithson with long camera exposures documenting the temporal changes in each work.

Installation works

DeSoto's installation works have typically made extensive use of manipulated recorded sound, with an emphasis on using directional speakers and projected imagery to create an evocative environment. Nearly all of deSoto's installations—e.g. Tahquitz (1994) and Aviary (1990) -- incorporate strategically mounted and/or hidden speakers and amplification systems. In works such as Tahquitz, prerecorded sounds are played through the speakers; in other works, such as Aviary, the sound is generated by dynamic elements in the work's environment and then manipulated and reproduced by the amplification system. DeSoto's more sculptural works often also include a sonic element: for example, in 1999's Recumbent (Three Works), the artist placed speakers and a piezo sound generator inside a replica of a Spanish medieval suit of armor; his 2006 conceptual car Cahuilla incorporates an audio system that plays back casino sounds and Cahuilla chanting.

In addition to works drawing from Catholic, Muslim, and Buddhist traditions, many of deSoto's installation works in the 1990s—such as Haypatak, Witness, Kansatsusha (1990) and Pe Tukmiyat, Pe Tukmiyat (Darkness, Darkness) (1991) at the San Jose Museum of Art—drew heavily upon Cahuilla creation mythology. But while the light and sound effects generated could appear otherworldly, Solnit noted in 1994 that "increasingly, his installations rely upon quotidian objects -- most often, furniture and machines, the objects appropriate to rooms for living and making, rather than looking at." She quotes deSoto's assertion that there is no word for sacredness in the Cahuilla language in support of the idea that his work asks questions about the possibility of locating the sacred in the everyday.

This theme is also explored in deSoto's sculpture Paranirvana (Self-Portrait), which was included in the "Missing Peace: Artists Consider the Dalai Lama," an exhibition of works "inspired by the life and message of the Dalai Lama" that has traveled since 2006 to major venues worldwide including UCLA's Fowler Museum, the Rubin Museum of Art in New York, the Nobel Museum in Stockholm, Fundacion Canal in Madrid, and the Frost Art Museum in Miami.  The 25-foot-long inflatable cloth  sculpture is based on a well known 12th century Buddha at the Gal Vihara in Polonnaruva, Sri Lanka—but the Buddha's face has been replaced by the artist's own. Paranirvana was created after deSoto's father died; curator Susan Stoops writes that despite its majestic size, its depiction of the Buddha (and the artist himself) at the moment of death combine with the cyclical deflation and inflation of the sculpture to "underscore a sense of insubstantiality and impermanence."

In 1991 deSoto was one of five artists commissioned to create site-specific artworks at the former site of the Rose Theatre in Bankside, London; in the accompanying catalog, deSoto states that he aims for his installations to take the form of an "experience, rather than a representation of ideas," and intends the work to take on its own "independent life...in time."

Works on paper, prints, and photography
DeSoto "has created photographs, prints and tapestries in series and individually," with emphasis in the field of photography, particularly landscape photography. His ongoing Appellation Series, for example, depicts wine-growing regions in California by digitally merging between 50 and 200 photographs into panoramic landscapes, some over eight feet in length.

Like his installations, many of deSoto's works on paper consider the relation between cosmological or sacred themes and otherwise mundane objects, locations, or imagery. For example, the 2003 pigment print Pakhan-gyi presents a field of thousands of collaged pornographic images from the internet - a reference to the mythical temptation of Buddha by visions of beautiful women—from which likenesses of the Buddha's footprints (some of the earliest depictions of the Buddha in Pakhan-gyi, Myanmar) emerge or disappear depending on the viewer's distance from the work. In 2005's The Restoration, the artist staged a tableau vivant in the style of Johannes Vermeer's dramatic paintings but set in a contemporary garage, complete with a mechanic working on a vintage Pontiac Grand Prix.

Conceptual cars
Following La Cena Pasada (2002), where deSoto painted and arranged thirteen 1/24-scale miniature replica cars in a 're-enactment' of Leonardo da Vinci's fresco of the Last Supper, and Sound of the Trumpet (1996), in which a V8 engine was outfitted to generate an environment of shifting light and sound, deSoto's sculpture began turning toward the modification of full-scale automobiles.

To date deSoto has created three conceptual car projects: Conquest (2004), Cahuilla (2006), and Imperial America (2008). These projects consist of vintage automobiles outfitted with what Nick Czap calls "meticulously deadpan" details and design elements. In a 2010 profile in the New York Times Auto section, Czap writes that the extensive and often symbolic modifications made to these cars transform them into "vehicles for exploring subjects from the acts of Spanish conquistadors to the empowerment of Native Americans to the military-industrial complex."

Czap writes that deSoto views his conceptual cars "as an extension of his work as an installation artist, describing the creation of installation art as a process of enhancing the 'performance' of an exhibition space."

In a 2011 interview deSoto says, "I think each car has a built-in opportunity for meaning, with some meanings needing to be more upfront than others. I view all the work as humorous in some way."

DeSoto's first conceptual car Conquest was re-made in such a subtle fashion that the artist presented it as a replica of a rare prototype at a Northern California Chrysler car show, where it won second prize. It was later shown at the Aldrich Contemporary Art Museum in Connecticut, the de Young Museum's "High 5" exhibit, and the International Center for the Arts of the Americas as well as the diRosa Preserve in Napa, CA. Historian Eric Foner writes of Conquest: "This 'public sculpture' by the Native American artist Lewis DeSoto links his own surname with more than four centuries of American history." In a 2006 essay about the No Reservations exhibition at the Aldrich Museum, Smithsonian National Museum curator Paul Chaat Smith writes of Conquest: "Lewis deSoto embraces the transgressive nature of No Reservations by building a car from a parallel universe."

In a 2005 documentary, The DeSoto Conquest, deSoto describes the genesis of the concept cars: "Well I'm hot-rodding spaces, I'm hot-rodding the notion of sculpture in various situations. Why not just go back to the hot-rod and start from there?’"

Publications
In 2016, a collection of photographs and essays by DeSoto titled EMPIRE was published by Heyday Books and the Robert and Frances Fullerton Museum of Art in San Bernardino. This book serves as a comprehensive collection of images from his Inland Empire project, a portion of which was exhibited at the Fullerton Museum from November 2015 to February 2016.

The artist's Inland Empire project, a photographic survey of various California sites begun in 1979, includes both single-frame and panoramic images; while the exhibition included only panoramas, the book includes both. DeSoto writes that "the panoramas constitute a broad public exposure," while the "single-frame images count as a kind of private view."

Exhibitions, collections and awards

DeSoto has exhibited widely across the United States as well as in England, Italy, Mexico, Portugal, and Sweden; in 1997 he was commissioned to create an installation, Dervish, at Metronom in Barcelona. His work Paranirvana has been exhibited in numerous major museums worldwide since 2006 as part of the Missing Peace exhibition.

His work is included in major museum, corporate, and private collections including the Atlantic Richfield Corporation; Bank of America; the California Museum of Photography; the Center for Creative Photography; the Des Moines Art Center; the Los Angeles Center for Photographic Studies; Los Angeles County Museum of Art; the Los Angeles Museum of Contemporary Art; the Long Beach Museum of Art; Microsoft Corporation; the Museum of History and Art in Fribourg, Switzerland; the Museum of Modern Art, New York; the Museum of Photographic Arts in San Diego; the Nelson-Atkins Museum; the Orange County Museum of Art; Safeco Corporation; the San Jose Museum of Art; the Seattle Art Museum; the Serralves Foundation in Oporto, Portugal; the Southern California Gas Company; Syntex Laboratories; and the Berkeley Art Museum.

In 1996, deSoto received an Artist Fellowship from the National Endowment for the Arts. He has received the Flintridge Foundation Award for Visual Artists (2003); a Eureka Fellowship in Visual Arts from the Fleishhacker Foundation (1999); and a California Arts Council Fellowship (1992). He has been Artist in Residence at List Visual Arts Center at MIT in 1997; Artpace in San Antonio, Texas in 1996; and at the Headlands Center for the arts in 1990 and again in 2000.

External links
 Lewis De Soto / MATRIX 144: Brochure from deSoto's 1991 exhibition at the Berkeley Art Museum with essay by Lawrence Rinder
 "Reclaiming the Landscape: the art of Lewis deSoto": article by Anya Montiel from American Indian magazine, Fall 2012
 Lewis deSoto on Vimeo
 Engineering Lewis deSoto's artwork: technical information about the electronics used in some of deSoto's work

American installation artists
Native American male artists
Living people
1954 births
Cahuilla people
People from San Bernardino, California
Artists from California
San Francisco State University faculty
Claremont Graduate University alumni
University of California, Riverside alumni
Native American photographers
20th-century Native Americans
21st-century Native Americans